The Black Ghost Bandit is a 1915 American silent short Western film directed by Tom Ricketts. The film stars Jack Richardson, Louise Lester, Harry Van Meter, Vivian Rich, Reaves Eason, and Joseph Knight.

Cast
 Jack Richardson as Brand - the Black Ghost Bandit
 Vivian Rich as Nell Brand
 Louise Lester as Mrs. Palmer
 Reaves Eason as Mr. Palmer
 Harry Van Meter as Sheriff Jordan
 Joseph Knight as Stage driver
 John Sampson as Guard

External links
 

1915 films
1915 Western (genre) films
American silent short films
American black-and-white films
Silent American Western (genre) films
Films directed by Tom Ricketts
1910s American films